Lingayen, officially the Municipality of Lingayen, is a 1st class municipality and capital of the province of Pangasinan, Philippines. According to the 2020 census, it has a population of 107,728 people.

It is the capital and the seat of government of the province of Pangasinan. Lingayen was a strategic point during World War II. It is also the birthplace of former President Fidel V. Ramos.

History
The Augustinian missionaries and the Spanish conquistadores drew a plan of Lingayen in 1614 and Lingayen was founded. The founders named the town Lingayen at the suggestion of natives themselves, due to a certain corpulent tamarind tree growing on the present town plaza at that time. The tree was exceptionally big, tall, and spreading; that the surrounding trees were just drafts in comparison. Passers-by developed the habit of looking back and back again at this corpulent tree until it would vanish from their rear view. When they arrived home and were asked what way they took in returning they would simply say "through Liñgayen".

The word "Liñgayen" was from the Pangasinan language word "lingawen" meaning " to look back". Since then up to the present time the town bears its name as Lingayen. Lingayen became the capital of Pangasinan when the province became an encomienda.

During World War II, Lingayen was invaded by the Japanese forces as one of the main targets due to being a gateway to the central plains of Central Luzon to race for the capital of Manila. During the occupation, Lingayen was a hotspot of US-sponsored guerrillas under Russell Volckmann. On November 22, 1942, the guerrillas burned the bridge at Baay, Lingayen when the Japanese forces started conducting their mopping operations the same day.

On January 9, 1945, Lingayen was where the Allied armies landed during the Invasion of Lingayen Gulf after the guerrillas have informed MacArthur that the Japanese had only a small presence in the area, giving the impression of being a safe place for the American incoming landing. Its long beach served as runway for several attack planes.

Geography
It is located along Lingayen Gulf, the Agno River and the Limahong Channel. It has a land area of 62.76 square kilometers consisting of 32 barangays and also has 7 sitios. Its terrain is flat, suitable for farms and fisheries. Lingayen weather is cool from December to February, warm from March to April, and the wet season is between May and October.

Barangays
Lingayen is politically subdivided into 32 barangays. These barangays are headed by elected officials: Barangay Captain, Barangay Council, whose members are called Barangay Councilors. All are elected every three years.

 Aliwekwek
 Baay
 Balangobong
 Balococ
 Bantayan
 Basing
 Capandanan
 Domalandan Center
 Domalandan East
 Domalandan West
 Dorongan
 Dulag
 Estanza
 Lasip
 Libsong East
 Libsong West
 Malawa
 Malimpuec
 Maniboc
 Matalava
 Naguelguel
 Namolan
 Pangapisan North
 Pangapisan Sur
 Poblacion
 Quibaol
 Rosario
 Sabangan
 Talogtog
 Tonton
 Tumbar
 Wawa

Climate

Demographics

Economy 

Agriculture, livestock and fishing are the major industries of the town.

Major crops include rice, corn, tomato, mongo, watermelon, and vegetables.

Livestock rising are predominant in the southern barangays where vast, long stretch of pasture lands can be found.

The major fishing ground is Lingayen Gulf within the municipal territorial waters of fifteen (15) kilometers from the shoreline classified as the municipal fishing ground. Fisheries can be found in every barangay.

Other major industries include making of world-class bagoong (also known as "maniboc": referring to its place of origin, Barangay Maniboc) and bocayo (sweetened coconut), vinegar, furnitures, crafts made of bamboo, and shingles made of nipa. Its bagoong shrimp paste is so well known, that in 2016 the Canadian Federal Court of Appeal was called to rule on whether the name "Lingayen" could be registered as a trademark to sell the paste (which it denied).

Agriculture
The town has a land area of 3,180 hectares or 47.5% of the total land area of the municipality used for agriculture by a land survey conducted by Municipal Planning Team. Rice, being the major crop produced, have 1,500 hectares/ 22.42% of the total land area of the municipality.  Corn come next with 341.50 hectares/ 5.11%, with peanut comes third with 136.6 hectares/2.04% while the rest of about 253.225 hectares or 3.78% is planted to different crops such as mongo, camote, eggplant, and other crops.

Livestock
Information gathered from the Office of the Municipal Agricultural Officer, shows that in year 2000 there were 5,282 head of swine, 2,762 head of cattle, 756 head of carabao, 1,520 head of sheep and goat combined, 44,000 head of poultry (commercial broilers), and 43,875 heads of poultry (native chickens).

Fishery
There are two types of fishery operation in the town depending on the type of water which supplies the fishery: brackish water and freshwater.

Brackish fisheries have a bigger land area than freshwater with a land area of 1,419.18 hectares. These fisheries can be found in 28 barangays with Baay being the largest with 157 hectares.

Freshwater fisheries have a land area of about 38.82 hectares and are located in ten barangays. Namolan have the largest with 7.80 hectares.

Socio-Cultural development
Lingayen poblacion has two portions, architecturally and culturally different from each other: Spanish and American because of the large influence of both two major colonizers.

The older portion influenced by Spanish is located in the southern part. The infrastructure that the Spanish planned was all town buildings face each other around a town plaza. The buildings include the Three Kings Parish Church and the Municipal Hall.

The American one built near Lingayen Gulf consists of many provincial government buildings including the Provincial Capitol and Urduja House, all located in the Capitol Grounds.

Tourism

The municipality has many attractions: Lingayen Beach, the Provincial Capitol, Urduja House, the World War II Memorabilia Ground Site, Sison Auditorium, the Narciso Ramos Sports Complex and Civic Center and the Limahong Channel Tourism Center located at Lingayen BayWalk beside Agno River, the center will have its own river cruise, tourism building center and river esplanade that is under construction and is set to commence its opening of Phase 1 in January 2021, while the Phase 2 and 3 of the tourism center awaits funding.

It also has two parks: the Town Park also known as Plaza de Lingayen and the Capitol Grounds. The town celebrates its Town Fiesta in honor of the Three Kings every first Friday, Saturday & Sunday of January; also celebrates "Bagoong Festival" to promote the main product of the town, happens a week after the town fiesta celebration; and joins to celebrate Pista'y Dayat (Beach Festival) which is being celebrated in the entire province of Pangasinan.

Heritage Structures

Heritage structures abound in the city of Lingayen:

Pangasinan Provincial Capitol Building is a neoclassical building designed by Ralph Harrington Doane. It was damaged during World War II and was reconstructed in 1946 with assistance from the US government under the Philippine Rehabilitation Act. With the completion of its repair and rehabilitation in 2008, the building earned the title "Best Provincial Capitol in the Philippines".

Urduja House, also called the Princess Urduja Palace, is named after the legendary warrior Princess Urduja. It currently serves as the governor's official residence and guest house.

Colegio del Santissimo Rosario Ruins was constructed in 1890 as an exclusive school for girls run by the Dominican sisters. Its lumber, windows, tin roofs, and beams were used to build another school in San Manuel town, leaving the structure in ruins. At present, it is within the compound of a private property.

Pangasinan National High School, erstwhile known as Pangasinan Academic High School, was the first public secondary school in Pangasinan. In 1946, the North and South Gabaldon buildings were constructed within the school campus. And now it is considered as the mother school in entire Pangasinan. Thousands of students are enrolled in this school. And due to the K-12 Program it also offer courses for Senior High School students. The school has several buildings for the Senior High School.

Malong Building is named after a Pangasinense hero named Andres Malong who led the revolt against the Spaniards from 1660 to 1661. Construction of the building started in 1956 and completed in 1958. It got a major renovation in 2008, the same year the Pangasinan Provincial Capitol Building had undergone a facelift.

Palaris Building, formerly known as Kalantiaw Building, was named after Datu Kalantiaw, said to have composed the first legal code of the Philippines, the Code of Kalantiaw. The code was said to be fraudulent and Kalantiyaw was not a Pangasinense but an Aklanon, according to some historical accounts. The building was renamed Palaris, in honor of the heroic acts of Pantaleon Perez, also known as "Palaris" in leading the Pangasinense rebels from 1762 to 1764 against the Spaniards.

Sison Auditorium was built in Neo-classical Style, and was constructed in 1927. It was initially known as the “Grand Provincial Auditorium” in the 1930s was the popular venue for zarzuelas and other cultural performances in pre-war and early post-war period. It was later renamed after former Governor Teofilo Sison, the first Pangasinense to become secretary of National Defense. In 2010, it had undergone a major renovation and inaugurated in the same year, April 5. At present, Sison Auditorium serves as the Cultural Center of Ilocos Region.

Transportation
Several bus companies like Victory Liner and Dagupan Bus Co. have routes going to Lingayen from Manila, Baguio, and Dagupan every day. The town has a small airport, Lingayen Airport, where light planes can land and served as a community airport in Lingayen and surrounding areas.

Government

Lingayen, belonging to the second congressional district of the province of Pangasinan, is governed by a mayor designated as its local chief executive and by a municipal council as its legislative body in accordance with the Local Government Code. The mayor, vice mayor, and the councilors are elected directly by the people through an election which is being held every three years.

Elected officials

Education

Elementary schools
Lingayen is divided in three school districts: I, II and III.

Lingayen I:
 Dulag ES
 Libsong ES
 Lingayen I CS
 Magsaysay ES
 Matalava ES
 Naguelguel ES
 Namolan ES
 Quibaol ES
 Tonton ES
 Tumbar ES

Lingayen II:
 Baay ES
 Balangobong ES
 Capandanan ES
 Domalandan Center ES
 Domalandan East ES
 Estanza ES
 Guesang ES
 Malimpuec ES
 Padilla CS
 Sabangan ES
 Samson-Bengson ES

Lingayen III:
 Aliwekwek ES
 Aplaya ES
 Balococ ES
 Bantayan ES
 Basing ES
 Lasip ES
 Malawa ES
 Pangapisan ES
 Poblacion CS
 Rosario ES
 Wawa ES

Private schools
 Harvent School
 Jesus Good Shepherd Development Center
 Saint Columban College
 Carvlex Academy
 Happy Times Christian School
 JN Montesorri High School
 Grace Baptist Learning Center of GFBC Inc.
 Saint Columban's Institute
 Lingayen Educational Center

High schools
 Estanza NHS
 Pangasinan NHS
 Pangasinan School of Arts and Trades
 Lasip NHS

Integrated schools
Domalandan IS
Malawa IS

Higher education
The municipality is home to three colleges and one university with two campuses.

 Pangasinan State University: Lingayen Campus and Open University systems
 Pangasinan Memorial College
 The Adelphi College
 St. Columban's College

Technical and Vocational Education

 Lingayen Technological Institute, Inc.
 TESDA-Pangasinan School of Arts and Trades

References

External links 

 Municipal Profile at the National Competitiveness Council of the Philippines 
 Lingayen at the Pangasinan Government Website 
 Local Governance Performance Management System
 [ Philippine Standard Geographic Code]
 Philippine Census Information
 Municipality of Lingayen Official Website
 Province of Pangasinan Official Website

Municipalities of Pangasinan
Provincial capitals of the Philippines
Populated places on the Agno River